Kalka railway station is the northern terminus of the Delhi–Kalka line and the starting point of the UNESCO World Heritage Site Kalka–Shimla Railway.  It is located in the Indian state of Haryana. It serves Kalka and passengers moving on to Shimla.

The railway station
It was allotted the railway code of KLK under the jurisdiction of Ambala railway division.

History
The Delhi–Panipat–Ambala–Kalka line was opened in 1891.

The -wide narrow-gauge Kalka–Shimla Railway was constructed by Delhi–Panipat–Ambala–Kalka Railway Company and opened for traffic in 1903. In 1905 the line was regauged to -wide narrow gauge.

Electrification
Chandigarh–Kalka sector was electrified in 1999–2000.

Loco sheds

Kalka has a narrow gauge diesel shed for the maintenance of ZDM-3 and ZDM-5 narrow gauge diesel locos.

Amenities
Kalka railway station has two double-bedded non-AC retiring rooms and a four-bedded dormitory. It has a computerized reservation office, vegetarian and non-vegetarian refreshment rooms and book stall.

Kalka Mail
Both the terminal stations had internal carriageway for the cars of Viceroy and other high-ranking officers to reach next to their rail coach, The carriageway at Howrah is still used and runs between platforms 8 and 9, but the carriageway at Kalka has been converted into a platform.

References

External links
 Trains at Kalka

Railway stations in Panchkula district
Ambala railway division
Transport in Kalka
Mountain railways in India
British-era buildings in Himachal Pradesh